Kanzaki may refer to:

Places
Kanzaki, Saga, a city in Saga Prefecture, Japan
Kanzaki, Hyōgo, a former town in Kanzaki District, Hyōgo Prefecture, Japan
Kanzaki District (disambiguation), multiple districts in Japan
Kanzaki Station (disambiguation), multiple railway stations in Japan

Other uses
Kanzaki (surname), a Japanese surname